The Polonaise in A♭ major, Op. 53 (Heroic Polonaise) for solo piano, was written by Frédéric Chopin in 1842. This composition is one of Chopin's most admired compositions and has long been a favorite of the romantic piano repertoire. Pianist Arthur Rubinstein once called it "the composition which is the closest to my heart." The piece requires exceptional piano skills and great virtuosity to be interpreted at a high degree of proficiency. It is also very physically demanding, and according to his student Adolphe Gutmann, Chopin played it more gently than most performers. The polonaise was dedicated to Auguste Léo, a German banker and friend of Chopin.

Origin of the sobriquet 'Heroic' 
George Sand, Chopin's longtime lover and companion, responded vigorously to the Revolutions of 1848 as did many intellectuals of the day. When the 1848 Revolution began in France, women had fewer rights than men. Sand believed women's rights were necessary for progress. Around this time, Sand started her own newspaper which was published in a workers' co-operative. This allowed her to publish more political essays, expressing her strongly felt convictions. In one of these, for example, she wrote, "I cannot believe in any republic that starts a revolution by killing its own proletariat."

On hearing Chopin's Polonaise, Sand was left with a deep symbolic impression which she communicated to Chopin in their private correspondence. In one of their letters, she wrote passionately, "" ("The inspiration! The force! The vigour! There is no doubt that such a spirit must be present in the French Revolution. From now on this polonaise should be a symbol, a heroic symbol"). In spite of Chopin's reluctance to bestow descriptive names on his music, music scholars and concert pianists have nevertheless associated the grand architecture of the music with this sobriquet, "Heroic."

Technical aspects 

The polonaise features many difficult technical aspects, including:
Fast ascending chromatic perfect fourths
Rapid, highly difficult octave scaling
Trills with the weaker fingers
Quick scales
Fast arpeggios
Broken chords
Chords with wide fingering
Use of a wide range of the piano keyboard
Large notational jumps

Structure 
The tempo of the piece is Alla polacca e maestoso ("like a polonaise and majestic"). The form may be viewed as intermediate between ternary (A-B-A) and rondo (A-B-A-C-A), since the first interlude is much shorter than the second (16 vs. 74 bars). The main theme is preceded by an introduction of about thirty seconds in length.

The piece features a grand introduction with fast ascending chromatic notes in both hands, setting the mood of the piece; also, it shows the heroic side of Chopin's art. The first theme is a dance-like theme in the tonic key of A major. It is the familiar part of the piece and has the left hand moving in pounding octaves. The theme is repeated up an octave with short trills that fill some of the auditory gaps in the theme. The first interlude presents a series of chord progressions that lead into a recount of the traditional polonaise melody, with the polonaise rhythm employed in the left-hand accompaniment. The main theme then repeats once more.

The second, main interlude (or trio section) opens with six loud arpeggio chords before switching to a very soft bass ostinato of descending octaves first in the key of E major and then in E major (written as D major). A march-like melody follows the descending octaves and this occurs twice, and then a long lyrical interlude firstly with harmonic chord progressions and frequent modulations. This ends in a descending passage before the main theme is replayed. The theme is played louder and more dramatically and ends in a coda including material derived from the main theme. A typical performance of the polonaise lasts seven minutes.

The piece is written in a  time marking but includes many implicit deviations from it.

In popular culture
The 1935 Irving Berlin song Cheek to Cheek shares a resemblance to the primary theme of the Polonaise in the opening bars.
The 1937 British film Moonlight Sonata opens with a concert performance of the Polonaise by Ignacy Jan Paderewski.
The 1945 film A Song to Remember, a fictionalization of Chopin's life, features the Polonaise.
The 1945 song "Till the End of Time" by Buddy Kaye and Bud Mossman is based on the Polonaise's main section.
In the first episode of The Addams Family (1964 TV series), Lurch plays the main theme on the harpsichord.
The song "Oliver Cromwell" by Monty Python is sung to the first (A♭) section of the Heroic Polonaise.
The 1971 song "Hyacinth House" by The Doors musically quotes the main theme during Ray Manzarek's organ solo.
In The Muppet Show episode "Zero Mostel" (1977), Dr. Teeth and the Electric Mayhem play a rock version of it.
In the 1996 movie adaptation of H. G. Wells's novel The Island of Dr. Moreau, Dr. Moreau performs this piano number for his dinner guests following a particularly festive banquet.
In Shine, the 1996 biopic of Australian pianist David Helfgott, young David performs the Polonaise in a music competition with enough vigor to cause the unsecured piano to roll away from him several times.
In Kate Atkinson’s 2015 novel A God in Ruins, Nancy Todd is determined to master the "Heroic" before succumbing to cancer.
The melody of the 2022 Beyooooonds song "Eiyuu ~Waratte! Chopin Senpai~" is based on the Polonaise.

References

External links 
 
 Heroic Polonaise sheet music at Musopen
, performed by Vladimir Horowitz (Time's "probably the greatest pianist of the 20th century")
, performed by Rafał Blechacz (the winner of the 15th International Chopin Piano Competition)

  performed by Valentina Igoshina (Great Russian Pianist)
  performed by Seong-Jin Cho (the winner of the 17th International Chopin Piano Competition)
 Manuscript (c.1842)

1842 compositions
Polonaises by Frédéric Chopin
Compositions in A-flat major
Polonaises